Hendrikus Johannes Paulus Overgoor (30 April 1944 – 23 April 2020) was a Dutch footballer who played as a left back.

He was born in Gendringen, Netherlands. He played for Go Ahead Eagles from 1963 to 1965 and for De Graafschap from 1965 to 1979.

Club career
With De Graafschap he won the 1968–69 Tweede Divisie and spent 4 years in the Eredivisie. He played a total of 393 league and cup matches for the Superboeren, which put him fourth on the club's all-time appearances table.

He was nicknamed De Kapper (The Hairdresser) because he came from a hairdressing family. He scored in the heroic 5-7 defeat at Feyenoord in October 1973, in which he scored but also almost choked in his chewing gum only for Guus Hiddink to hit him in the back and regaining his breath.

Personal life
Overgoor died in Amsterdam on 23 April 2020, at age 75, seven days short from his 76th birthday of complications from COVID-19 during the COVID-19 pandemic in the Netherlands.

References

1944 births
2020 deaths
People from Oude IJsselstreek
Association football fullbacks
Dutch footballers
Go Ahead Eagles players
De Graafschap players
Eredivisie players
Eerste Divisie players
Tweede Divisie players
Deaths from the COVID-19 pandemic in the Netherlands
Footballers from Gelderland